Ernest Clarence Breeze (8 May 1910 – 2 December 1984) was an English footballer who played at left-back for Port Vale and Shrewsbury Town in the 1930s.

Career
Breeze joined Port Vale in August 1932. He made his debut in January 1934, and played three further Second Division games in the 1933–34 season. He was a first team favourite from November 1934, taking over from Jim Kelso, and ended the 1934–35 season with 26 league and cup appearances. He played just ten games in the 1935–36 season, and was released from The Old Recreation Ground in the summer. He moved on to Shrewsbury Town.

Career statistics
Source:

References

Sportspeople from Burslem
English footballers
Association football fullbacks
Port Vale F.C. players
Shrewsbury Town F.C. players
English Football League players
1910 births
1984 deaths